The 2021 CAF Women's Champions League CECAFA Qualifiers is the 1st edition of the CAF Women's Champions League CECAFA Qualifiers, a women's club football championship organised by the CECAFA for the women's clubs of association nations. This edition will held from 7–21 August 2021 in Kenya.

The winner of the tournament will qualify for the inaugural 2021 CAF Women's Champions League which will held later this year.

Participating clubs
The following nine teams will contest in the league. Denden FC from Eritrea and Al-Difaa from Sudan were not selected by CAF. CAF has decided to reject the club's license for failing to meet the criteria for this competition. Scandanavian LFC of Rwanda will not take to the tournament.

Venues

Match officials

Referees
 Shamirah Nabadda (Uganda)
 Suavis Iratunga (Burundi)
 Darlene Nduwayo (Burundi)
 Asnakech Gebire (Ethiopia)
 Medab Wondmu Biftu (Ethiopia)
 Carolyne Wanjala (Kenya)
 Josphine Wanjiku (Kenya)
 Florentina Zabron Chief (Tanzania)

Assistant Referees
 Lydia Nantabo (Uganda)
 Marex Nkumbi Nakitto (Uganda)
 Arcella Uwizera (Burundi)
 Fidès Bangurambona (Burundi)
 Woinshet Kassaye Abera (Ethiopia)
 Yelfashewa Kassahun (Ethiopia)
 Jane Cherono (Kenya)
 Carolyne Kiles (Kenya)
 Janeth Balama (Tanzania)
 Hellen Mduma (Tanzania)

Draw
The draw of the tournament were held on 17 July 2021. Nine club's were divided into three groups. Groups winner and from three groups and one best 2nd place team will through to Knockout stage.

Group summary

Group stage
The tournament will played into two groups format.

Tiebreakers
Teams are ranked according to points (3 points for a win, 1 point for a draw, 0 points for a loss), and if tied on points, the following tiebreaking criteria are applied, in the order given, to determine the rankings.
Points in head-to-head matches among tied teams;
Goal difference in head-to-head matches among tied teams;
Goals scored in head-to-head matches among tied teams;
If more than two teams are tied, and after applying all head-to-head criteria above, a subset of teams are still tied, all head-to-head criteria above are reapplied exclusively to this subset of teams;
Goal difference in all group matches;
Goals scored in all group matches;
Penalty shoot-out if only two teams are tied and they met in the last round of the group;
Disciplinary points (yellow card = 1 point, red card as a result of two yellow cards = 3 points, direct red card = 3 points, yellow card followed by direct red card = 4 points);
Drawing of lots.

Group A

Group B

Knockout stage

Bracket

Semi-finals

Third place match

Final

Statistics

Goalscorers

Own goals

References

External links

2021 CAF Women's Champions League
Women's Champions League
CAF